Thargomindah   (frequently shortened to Thargo) is a rural town and locality in the Shire of Bulloo, Queensland, Australia. The town of Thargomindah is the administrative centre for the Shire of Bulloo. It was founded on Wongkumara and Kalali territory.

On 17 April 2020, the Queensland Government decided to reorganise the nine localities in the Shire of Bulloo, resulting in six localities.

Geography 

The town of Thargomindah is the administrative centre for the Shire of Bulloo. It lies on the Bulloo River in the centre of the locality.

Five main roads radiate from the town:

 the Bundeena Road goes west to Noccundra
 the Quilpie Road goes north-east to Quilpie
 the Cunnamulla Road (also known as the Bulloo Developmental Road and the Adventure Way) goes east to Yowah and Eulo and beyond to Cunnamulla
 the Hungerford Road goes south to Hungerford
 the Bulloo Downs Road goes south-west to Bulloo Downs

Thargomindah is part of the Channel Country where the rivers are mostly dry riverbeds except for seasonal flooding. The locality contributes to three major drainage basins:

 in the south-east, creeks flow into the Paroo River system in the Murray-Darling basin
 in the centre, creeks flow into the Bulloo River system in the Bulloo-Bancannia drainage basin
 in the north-west, creeks flow into Wilson River system in the Lake Eyre basin

The Bulloo River flows through the locality from the north-east (Quilpie) through the town and exits the locality to the south-west (Bulloo Downs).

The land is principally used for low density cattle grazing. The Dynevor Downs homestead is located on the Cunnamulla Road.

Lake Bindegolly National Park is located in the east of the locality. A portion of the Currawinya National Park is on the south-eastern boundary of the locality, although the bulk of that national park was in adjacent Hungerford.

Lake Bullawarra is in the northwest of the locality approximately  NW of the town and is a nationally important wetland. It is a habitat for a vulnerable species, the Major Mitchell's cockatoo.

History

Margany (also known as Marganj, Mardigan, Marukanji, Maranganji) is an Australian Aboriginal language spoken by the Margany people. The Margany language region includes the landscape within the local government boundaries of the Quilpie Shire, taking in Quilpie, Cheepie and Beechal extending towards Eulo and Thargomindah, as well as the properties of Dynevor Downs and Ardoch.

Gunya (Kunya, Kunja, Kurnja) is an Australian Aboriginal language spoken by the Gunya people. The Gunya language region includes the landscape within the local government boundaries of the Paroo Shire Council, taking in Cunnamulla and extending north towards Augathella, east towards Bollon and west towards Thargomindah.

Kullilli (Kalali, Garlali, Galali) is an Australian Aboriginal language spoken by the Kullilli people. The Kullilli language region spans Channel Country in South West Queensland, encompassing the township of Thargomindah and areas of the Bulloo, Paroo, and Quilpie Shires.

The town was first settled in the 1860s at a crossing of the Bulloo River. The town takes its name from the parish, which in turn was named after the Thargomindah pastoral run, which is an Aboriginal word meaning echidna.

A post office was established in 1870 and a telegraph line connected the town to Cunnamulla in 1881.

Thargomindah Provisional School opened on 1 April 1884. In 1892 it became Thargomindah State School.

The 1890s saw the town prosper as the service and administrative centre of a pastoral district. An extension of the Western railway line to the town was planned for many years; however it never eventuated.  The railway did reach Cunnamulla in 1898 and Quilpie in 1917.

Thargomindah was one of the first towns in Australia to produce hydroelectric power from 1898 until 1951. The old bore into the Great Artesian Basin was a source of energy when electric street lights were lit and coupled to a turbine driven by the bore's natural water pressure. The generator was taken from a unit powered by a steam engine and purchased by the Bulloo Divisional Board becoming the first municipality owned power plant. After that power was supplied by diesel generators until 1988, when the town was connected to the state power grid via Cunnamulla. The power station is still operating with a daily opening to the public.

St Edmund's Anglican Church at 60 Dowling Street was dedicated on 22 October 1960 by Archbishop Reginald Halse. Its closure on 28 May 2003 was approved by Venerable Gary Frederick Harch, Archdeacon of the West. It is now used as a private home.

On 17 April 2020 the Queensland Government decided to reorganise the nine localities in the Shire of Bulloo, resulting in six localities.

Heritage listings
Thargomindah has a number of nearby heritage-listed sites, including:

 Bulloo River, Bulloo Downs: Dr Ludwig Becker's Grave
Nappa Merrie Station, Durham: Burke and Wills Dig Tree
 Wilson Street, Noccundra: Noccundra Hotel

Facilities
An information centre is located at 37 Dowling Street, Thargomindah.  The building is a renovation of a children's hostel which was built in early 1960, it then became a block of flats and ended up being an empty run-down building until converted to a very modern facility containing the Visitor Information Centre, Library and Coffee Shop.  The hostel was used for children who lived in remote properties where they would board at the hostel during the week, returning home on the weekends to their families.

The Information Centre contains brochures, pamphlets and maps on the South West Queensland corner and surrounding areas.  It is the first place where people stop when they visit Thargomindah to get the latest road conditions, directions, places to stay, things to see and do and the latest information on events.

Bulloo Shire Council operates Thargomindah Library at Shire Office, Dowling Street, Thargomindah.

Thargomindah has two fuel stations; Thargo Motors which is open Mon to Fri and Sat mornings and Thargo Roadhouse which has 24 hour fuel using an EFTPOS facility.

Accommodation consists of the Oasis Motel, Bulloo River Hotel Motel, Explorers Caravan Park and Napunyah Caravan Park.

Dining out options are the Oasis Motel, Bulloo River Hotel Motel, Coffee on Dowling and Thargo Roadhouse.

Education 
Thargomindah State School is a government primary (Early Childhood-6) school for boys and girls at Dowling Street. In 2018, the school had an enrolment of 24 students with 3 teachers and 5 non-teaching staff (3 full-time equivalent).

The nearest government secondary (8–12) school is Cunnamulla P-12 State School.

Water

Thargomindah has a pressurised hot spring from a bore into the Great Artesian Basin and has produced hydroelectric power from the basin in the past. After 2 years of drilling, a good supply of water was found in 1893. There is a plentiful water supply for the population and the arid area available for irrigation in front and backyards and public warm showers are provided.

Transport
Thargomindah Airport is located to the north of the town on Kerr Street. It is operated by the Bulloo Shire Council and there are 2 scheduled flights from Brisbane each week on Regional Express Airlines. It was completely rebuilt in 2018.

Climate
Thargomindah has a hot semi-arid climate (Köppen BSh), very closely bordering on a hot arid climate (BWh), which is found in the western part of the shire. Summers are sweltering and generally dry except when monsoonal incursions into the continent bring heavy rain, whilst winters are warm and dry with cool to cold mornings.

References

External links

 
 Bulloo Shire
 Thargomindah on Action Graphics
 Thargomindah on WalkAbout
 Hydro Power Plant

Towns in Queensland
South West Queensland
Shire of Bulloo
Localities in Queensland